US Naval Ordnance Testing Facility Assembly Building is a historic building located at Topsail Island, Pender County, North Carolina. It was built in 1946 by Kellex Corporation, and is a 1 1/2-story, reinforced concrete and concrete block building.  It measures 75 feet by 82 feet and has a low-pitched, gable-front roof. The building was abandoned by the military in 1948 and subsequently used for commercial and recreational purposes.  It was erected for the purpose of fabricating and storing missiles used in "Operation Bumblebee."

It was listed on the National Register of Historic Places in 1993.

References

Military facilities on the National Register of Historic Places in North Carolina
Buildings and structures completed in 1946
Buildings and structures in Pender County, North Carolina
National Register of Historic Places in Pender County, North Carolina